The 2023 Virginia Cavaliers football team will represent the University of Virginia as a member of the Atlantic Coast Conference (ACC) during the 2023 NCAA Division I FBS football season. The Cavaliers will be led by second-year head coach Tony Elliott and play home games at the Scott Stadium in Charlottesville, Virginia.

Schedule
Virginia and the ACC announced the 2023 football schedule on January 30, 2023. The 2023 season will be the conference's first season since 2004, that its scheduling format just includes one division. The new format sets Virginia with three set conference opponents, while playing the remaining ten teams twice in an (home and away) in a four–year cycle. The Cavaliers three set conference opponents for the next four years is; Louisville, North Carolina, and Virginia Tech.

References

Virginia Cavaliers
Virginia Cavaliers football seasons
Virginia Cavaliers football